The Solomon Islands national under-17 football team is the national U-17 team of Solomon Islands and is controlled by the Solomon Islands Football Federation.

History
In the 2015 OFC U-17 Championship striker Larry Zama scored thirteen goals in the course of the campaign making him the top goal scorer of the tournament. He scored eight goals in a single game against American Samoa, a tournament record to that date. In the semi-finals of the 2018 OFC U-16 Championship Solomon Islands defeated Fiji to qualify for the 2019 FIFA U-17 World Cup in Peru. Solomon Islands were to make their FIFA U-17 World Cup Debut in Peru in 2019; however on 15 February 2019 Solomon Islands seemed to have forfeited their chance of playing in the event due to over-age player Chris Satu. In February 2019 it was also announced that Raphael Lea'i and Leon Kofana will go to Scots College, Wellington and train with Wellington Phoenix FC. On 3 Mar 2019, upon OFC Executive Committee appeal Solomon Islands were able to keep their spot for the 2019 FIFA U-17 World Cup, which will now be played in Brazil after Peru's hosting rights were withdrawn due to infrastructure concerns and delays of the organizing committee. Their first FIFA U-17 World Cup match is on 28 October 2019 in Group F where Solomon Islands will play against Italy, then 31 October where they will play against Paraguay and the last Group F on 3 November which they will play against Mexico.

Competition Record

FIFA U-17 World Cup record

OFC U-17 Championship record
The OFC Under 17 Championship is a tournament held once every two years to decide the only two qualification spots for the Oceania Football Confederation (OFC) and its representatives at the FIFA U-17 World Cup.

History Matches

2015

2017

2018

2019

Current Technical Staff

Current squad
The following players were called up for the 2019 FIFA U-17 World Cup from 26 October - 17 November in Brazil.

Caps and goals as of 3 November 2019 after the game against Mexico.

Recent call-ups
The following players have been called up for the team in the last 12 months.

2017 squad
The following players were called up for the 2017 OFC U-17 Championship from 11 to 24 February 2017.

Caps and goals as of 18 January 2017 after the game against Samoa.

List of coaches
  Chris Asipara (2010-2012)
  Jacob Moli (2014-2016)
  Marlon Hoekarawa (2016-2017)
  Stanley Waita (2018-)

References

External links
Solomon Islands Football Federation official website

under-17
Oceanian national under-17 association football teams